The ninth season of The Bachelorette premiered on May 27, 2013. This season features 27-year-old Desiree Hartsock, a bridal stylist from Northglenn, Colorado. Hartsock finished in fourth place on season 17 of The Bachelor featuring Sean Lowe. 

The final episode aired on August 5, 2013, with Hartsock accepting a proposal from 27-year-old mortgage broker Chris Siegfried. They married January 18, 2015, and currently live in Portland, Oregon with their two sons, Asher and Zander.

Production

Casting and contestants
Casting began during the airing of the eighth season of the show, in 2012. Before the bachelorette was chosen, one potential candidate, Misee Harris, a pediatric dentist from Tennessee, was vying to become the first black bachelorette. Her social media campaign was covered in a number of major news outlets, including The Huffington Post. According to the website Jezebel, Harris had previously been selected to be a contestant on The Bachelor, only to not take the role for fear of being the 'token' black woman. At that point every star in all 25 combined seasons of The Bachelorette or The Bachelor had been Caucasian, with show producer Mike Fleiss stating to the media that non-caucasians simply didn't appear at the casting calls.

On March 11, 2013, during the After the Final Rose on season 17 of The Bachelor, Desiree Hartsock was selected as the bachelorette, then 26, a bridal stylist from Northglenn, Colorado. Like the bachelorettes in the previous seasons, Hartsock had been a contestant on The Bachelor, having been sent home by Sean Lowe after the hometown dates episode in that season. Misee Harris went on to work as a model and entrepreneur, founding a line of mouthguards and starting Project Smile, an organization that "focuses on promoting self-esteem in children."

Notable contestants include soccer player Juan Pablo Galavis, who would become the first non-Caucasian star for the combined franchises the following year, appearing in season 18 of The Bachelor.

Filming and development
Filming began on March 13, 2013, shortly after the season finale of The Bachelor, with many places including Atlantic City, New Jersey, the German state of Bavaria, Barcelona, Spain and the island of Madeira in Portugal. With appearances from Andy Grammer, Soulja Boy, Darius Rucker, Kate Earl and Matt White.

Contestants
Biographical information according to ABC official series site, which gives first names only, plus footnoted additions. Ages stated are at time of contest.

Future appearances

The Bachelor
Juan Pablo Galavis was chosen as the bachelor for the eighteenth season of The Bachelor. He became the first Latino bachelor in the franchise's history.

Bachelor in Paradise
Season 1

Ben Scott, Brooks Forester, Zack Kalter, and Robert Graham, returned for the first season of Bachelor in Paradise. Scott quit the show during week 2. Forester was eliminated during week 6. During week 7, Kalter split from his partner, Jackie Parr, and Graham split from his partner, Sarah Herron.

Season 2

Dan Cox, Michael Garofola and Mikey Tenerelli returned for the second season of Bachelor in Paradise. Garofola and Tenerelli were eliminated during week 2. Tenerelli returned in week 4. He and Cox quit the show during week 5.

Season 3

Brandon Andreen returned for the third season of Bachelor in Paradise. He was eliminated during week 2.

The Bachelor Winter Games
Garofola returned for The Bachelor Winter Games as a part of Team USA. He quit the show during week 3.

Other appearances
Outside of Bachelor Nation franchise, Kalter appeared as a contestant in the Bachelors vs. Bachelorettes special on the season 7 of Wipeout alongside Kasey Stewart and Larry Burchett.

Call-out order

 The contestant received the first impression rose
 The contestant received a rose outside of a rose ceremony or date
 The contestant received a rose during a date
 The contestant was eliminated
 The contestant was eliminated outside the rose ceremony
 The contestant was eliminated during a date
 The contestant quit the competition
 The contestant was disqualified from the competition
 The contestant won the competition

Episodes

References

External links

2013 American television seasons
The Bachelorette (American TV series) seasons
Television shows filmed in California
Television shows filmed in New Jersey
Television shows filmed in Germany
Television shows filmed in Spain
Television shows filmed in Portugal
Television shows filmed in Texas
Television shows filmed in Arizona
Television shows filmed in Oregon
Television shows filmed in Utah
Television shows filmed in Antigua and Barbuda